Major General James G. Jones (September 1, 1934 – October 21, 2020) was a United States Air Force general and commander of the Keesler Technical Training Center, Keesler Air Force Base, Mississippi.

Jones earned a bachelor of arts degree (cum laude) in mathematics from Miami University, Oxford, Ohio, in 1956 where he was a member of Phi Kappa Tau. He received a master's degree in public administration from Auburn University in 1975. General Jones was a distinguished graduate of Air Command and Staff College in 1968, and the Air War College in 1975. Both schools are located at Maxwell Air Force Base, Alabama.

He was commissioned through the Air Force Reserve Officer Training Corps program in 1956 and received his navigator wings at Harlingen Air Force Base, Texas, in September 1957.

General Jones is a master navigator with 3,000 flying hours. His military decorations and awards include the Air Force Distinguished Service Medal, Legion of Merit, Distinguished Flying Cross, Meritorious Service Medal with oak leaf cluster, Air Medal with eight oak leaf clusters, Joint Service Commendation Medal, Air Force Commendation Medal with two oak leaf clusters, Combat Readiness Medal and Armed Forces Expeditionary Medal.

  Air Force Distinguished Service Medal
  Legion of Merit
  Distinguished Flying Cross
  Meritorious Service Medal with one oak leaf cluster
  Air Medal with eight oak leaf clusters
  Joint Service Commendation Medal
  Air Force Commendation Medal with two oak leaf clusters
  Combat Readiness Medal
  Armed Forces Expeditionary Medal

He was promoted to major general on October 1, 1983, with date of rank of September 1, 1980.  Jones retired from the Air Force on July 1, 1988, and died on October 21, 2020.

Notes

References
This article incorporates text in the public domain from the United States Air Force.

1934 births
2020 deaths
Air University (United States Air Force) alumni
Auburn University alumni
Miami University alumni
Recipients of the Distinguished Flying Cross (United States)
Recipients of the Legion of Merit
Recipients of the Air Force Distinguished Service Medal
United States Air Force generals
United States Air Force personnel of the Vietnam War
Recipients of the Air Medal